Jessica Klimkait (born 31 December 1996) is a Canadian Judoka who competes in the women's 57 kg category. In 2021 she became Canada's second judo world champion, defeating Momo Tamaoki of Japan in the women's lightfoot (57 kg) final at the championships in Budapest, Hungary; the win also qualified her for the Tokyo Olympic Games. She won one of the bronze medals in the women's 57 kg event at the 2020 Summer Olympics.

Career
In 2013 at the Cadet (U18) World Championship in Miami she became the first Canadian female judoka to win an age group world championship. She won gold at the 2017 Pan American Judo Championships.

In 2021, she won one of the bronze medals in her event at the 2021 Judo World Masters held in Doha, Qatar. A few months later, she won the silver medal in her event at the 2021 Judo Grand Slam Antalya held in Antalya, Turkey.

In June 2021, Klimkait was named to Canada's 2020 Olympic team.  She won the bronze medal in the  class with a win over Kaja Kajzer of Slovenia, by waza-ari.

Early life
Klimkait began practicing judo at the age of five at the Ajax Budokan Judo Club after watching her older brother's involvement in the sport.

Senior International results

See also
 Judo in Ontario
 Judo in Canada
 List of Canadian judoka

References

External links
 
 
 

1996 births
Living people
Canadian female judoka
Commonwealth Games competitors for Canada
Judoka at the 2014 Summer Youth Olympics
Judoka at the 2014 Commonwealth Games
Olympic judoka of Canada
Judoka at the 2020 Summer Olympics
Medalists at the 2020 Summer Olympics
Olympic bronze medalists for Canada
Olympic medalists in judo
Sportspeople from Whitby, Ontario
World judo champions
20th-century Canadian women
21st-century Canadian women